Aechmea caesia is a plant species in the genus Aechmea. This species is endemic to the State of Rio de Janeiro in Brazil.

Cultivars
 Aechmea 'Sarah'

References

caesia
Flora of Brazil
Plants described in 1889